Sessions is a surname of Anglo-Norman origin, ultimately from the French Soissons. Notable people with the surname include:

 Almira Sessions (1888–1974), American actress
 Clarence W. Sessions (1859–1931), American judge
 Jeff Sessions (born 1946), United States Attorney General and United States Senator 
 John Sessions (born 1953–2020), British actor and comedian 
 J. Wyley Sessions (1885–1977), American religious official
 Kate Sessions (1857–1940), American horticulturist
 Loren B. Sessions (1827–1897), New York politician
 Michael Sessions (born 1987), American politician and Michigan mayor
 Patty Bartlett Sessions (1795–1892), American mother, pioneer, agriculturalist and midwife
 Pete Sessions (born 1955), American politician and Texas Congressman
 Ramon Sessions (born 1986), American professional basketball player for the Washington Wizards
 Roger Sessions (1896–1985), American composer
 Tiffany Sessions (born 1968), American woman who has been missing since 1989
 Walter L. Sessions (1820–1896), United States Congressman from New York
 William K. Sessions III (born 1947), American judge in Vermont
 William S. Sessions (1930–2020), American judge and FBI Director